

Driftwood is wood that has been washed onto a shore or beach of a sea, lake, or river by the action of winds, tides or waves.

In some waterfront areas, driftwood is a major nuisance. However, the driftwood provides shelter and food for birds, fish and other aquatic species as it floats in the ocean. Gribbles, shipworms and bacteria decompose the wood and gradually turn it into nutrients that are reintroduced to the food web. Sometimes, the partially decomposed wood washes ashore, where it also shelters birds, plants, and other species. Driftwood can become the foundation for sand dunes.

Most driftwood is the remains of trees, in whole or part, that have been washed into the ocean, due to flooding, high winds, or other natural occurrences, or as the result of logging.  There is also a subset of driftwood known as drift lumber. Drift lumber includes the remains of man-made wooden objects, such as buildings and their contents washed into the sea during storms, wooden objects discarded into the water from shore, dropped dunnage or lost cargo from ships (jetsam), and the remains of shipwrecked wooden ships and boats (flotsam).  Erosion and wave action may make it difficult or impossible to determine the origin of a particular piece of driftwood.

Driftwood can be used as part of decorative furniture or other art forms, and is a popular element in the scenery of fish tanks.

Use as firewood
The EPA includes driftwood in its list of "Items You Should Never Burn in Your [Wood-Burning] Appliance," because it will "release toxic chemicals when burned".

History
According to Norse mythology, the first humans, Ask and Embla, were formed out of two pieces of driftwood, an ash and an elm, by the god Odin and his brothers, Vili and Vé. The Vikings would cast wood into the sea before making landfall. The location of the wood would be an indication as to where to build their mead halls. The wood used would found the high-seat pillars of the new hall.

Driftwood carried by Arctic rivers was the main, or sometimes only, source of wood for some Inuit and other Arctic populations living north of the tree line until they came into regular contact with European traders. Traditional Inuit boats such as the kayak were fashioned from driftwood frames covered in skins. The Inuit classified driftwood into seven different types, each possessing its own unique material and visual properties. Driftwood could be used to make bows if it was straight grained and in reasonably good condition; these were reinforced with sinew cables. The Inuit even made arrows from driftwood; these were often short and fitted with bone or antler foreshafts. Dry scrapings produced by working this material were collected, stored and used for the starting of fires year-round by Inuit. Wood that is burned today in these regions mainly consists of the remains of condemned wooden structures. Driftwood is still used as kindling by some. Woods with resinous qualities, such as cedar, are preferred for their lengthier burning times. 

The "Old Man of the Lake" in Crater Lake, Oregon is a full-size tree that has been bobbing vertically in the lake for more than a century. Due to the cold water of the lake, the tree has been well preserved.

Alice Gray, the legendary "Diana of the Dunes", who fought to preserve the Indiana Dunes which contain quantities of driftwood named her college "Driftwood", and made all her furniture from driftwood.

Sculptures

Driftwood sculptures are sculptures that are made of driftwood found on beaches or along riverbanks.
At Kullaberg, Sweden, Lars Vilks created Nimis a driftwood artwork in the year 1980.  This sculpture and two others led to the declaration of Ladonia as an independent nation.
Sculptures were created on the Emeryville, California mudflat and marsh area of San Francisco Bay in the late 1960s.
The Ashden Awards for Sustainable Energy (sometimes called the "Green Oscars") are sculpted out of driftwood.
Artist Deborah Butterfield is known for her sculptures of horses, initially rendered from driftwood before being cast in bronze.
In January the annual Driftwood and Sand festival is held in Hokitika, New Zealand.

Decline
With the advent of industrial logging practices, the global quantity of driftwood has declined. Early accounts indicate that driftwood was once more plentiful. Early photographs of the pacific coast reveal greater amounts of driftwood on the beaches than is present today. Likewise, when traveling in Dixon Entrance in the late 1800s, George A. Dorsey recorded that many beaches were "piled high with drift, often to a height of sixty feet or more."  Melting polar ice may also contribute to the decline of Siberian driftwood in the Atlantic as the sea ice enabled driftwood to travel greater distances without becoming waterlogged.

See also
 Sea glass
 Large woody debris

References

External links

Wood